Rasulabad (also Romanized as Rasūlābād) is a village in Kahnuk Rural District, Irandegan District, Khash County, Sistan and Baluchestan Province, Iran. At the 2006 census, its population was 180, in 44 families.

References 

Populated places in Khash County